Qu Xiaohui (Chinese: 曲晓辉; born 10 March 1987 in Dalian) is a Chinese football player who currently plays for Shenyang Urban in the China League One.

Club career
In 2005, Qu Xiaohui started his professional footballer career with Liaoning Whowin in the Chinese Super League. He would eventually make his league debut for Liaoning on 9 July 2005 in a game against Shandong Luneng Taishan, coming on as a substitute for Zhao Junzhe in the 76th minute.

In 2010, Qu transferred to China League Two side Harbin Yiteng.
In March 2011, Qu transferred to Chinese Super League side Changchun Yatai.
In January 2013, Qu transferred to Chinese Super League side Liaoning Whowin.  In July 2013, he was loaned to China League Two side Lijiang Jiayunhao until 31 December.
On 25 January 2016, Qu signed for China League One club Dalian Yifang.

In March 2018, Qu transferred to China League Two club Dalian Boyoung.

Career statistics 
Statistics accurate as of match played 31 December 2020.

Honours

Club
Liaoning Whowin
China League One: 2009

Dalian Yifang
China League One: 2017

References

External links

1987 births
Living people
Chinese footballers
Footballers from Dalian
Zhejiang Yiteng F.C. players
Changchun Yatai F.C. players
Liaoning F.C. players
Yunnan Flying Tigers F.C. players
Dalian Professional F.C. players
Liaoning Shenyang Urban F.C. players
Chinese Super League players
China League One players
China League Two players
Association football midfielders